This is a list of foreign players in Guatemalan Liga Nacional. The following players:
have played at least one official game for their respective clubs.
are listed as squad members for the current .
have not been capped for the Guatemala national team at any level.
includes uncapped players with dual nationality.

In italic: Players currently signed, but have yet to play a league match.

In Bold: Current foreign Primera División de Fútbol Profesional. players and their present team.

Naturalized Players 
  Darwin Oliva – Municipal
  Gerson Tinoco
  Dennis López - Deportes Savio, Deportivo Petapa, Deportivo Mixco, Deportivo Marquense and C.S.D. Municipal
  Rigoberto Gómez - Comunicaciones
  Israel Silva - Teculutan, Xelaju, Municipal, Jalapa, Antigua

South America (CONMEBOL)

Argentina 
 Lucas Emanuel Acosta - Sanarate
 Ricardo Carreño - Xelajú,  Municipal, Comunicaciones
 Fabián Castillo - Antigua, Sanarate
 Luis Carlos Contini - Comunicaciones
 Alejandro Diaz - Antigua, CSD Municipal
 Marcelo Ferreira
 Fernando Gallo - Juventud Retalteca, Peñarol	
 Cristian Alexis Hernández - Sanarate,  Comunicaciones
 Omar Larrosa - Comunicaciones
 Jorge Luis Lopez - Comunicaciones
 Juan Lovato - Petapa, Sanarate
 Alberto Ramírez
 Jorge Sotomayor - Coban Imperial
 Cristian Daniel Taborda - Sanarate
 Héctor Tambasco -  Comunicaciones
 Marcelo Verón  - Suchitepéquez
 Domingo Zalazar - Suchitepéquez

Bolivia 
 Vladimir Castellón  - Xelaju
 José Gabriel Ríos - Guastatoya

Brazil 
 Juliano de Andrade - Marquense, Xelaju, Petapa
 Janderson Kione Pereira - Petapa, CSD Municipal, Coban Imperial
 Marcio Leandro Barbosa - Xelajú
 Roger Bastos Coitinho - Coban
 Evandro Ferreira - Heredia, Suchitepéquez
 Thiago Augusto Leite - Marquense
 Neto Mineiro - Marquense
 Terencio de Oliveira - Marquense
 Guilherme de Paula - Peñarol
 Rafael Da Roza - Santa Lucia
 Jurandir Dos Santos - 
 Milton Queiroz “Tita”  - Comunicaciones
 Sandro Zamboni - Petapa

Chile 
 Hernán Godoy - Comunicaciones
 Fabián Muñoz - Comunicaciones, Zacapa, Coban Imperial, Universidad de San Carlos

Colombia  
 Luis Carlos Asprilla -  Petapa
 José Alfredo Corena Barboza - Guastatoya
 William Zapata Brand - Xelajú, Sanarate
 Juan Camilo García - Xelajú
 Henry Javier Hernández - Juventud Retalteca, Heredia
 Juan David Osorio - Marquense, Antigua
 Roberto Carlos Peña - Antigua, Marquense, Malacateco, Coatepeque
 Yeison Daniel Pérez  - Marquense
 Julio Andrés Valdez - Siquinala

Paraguay  
 Lauro Ramón Cazal - Coban Imperial
 Carlos González - Municipal
 Carlos Leguizamón - Suchitepéquez
 Orlando Javier Moreira - Coban, CSD Municipal

Uruguay  
 Adrián Apellaniz -  Comunicaciones
 Rodrigo Bengua - Mictlán
 José Luis Cardozo
 Jonathan Charquero - Coban Imperial
 Martín Crossa	- Xelajú
 Rodrigo Cubilla - Petapa
 Darío Ferreira - Xelaju
 Ignacio Flores - Coban Imperial
 Álvaro Marcelo García - Xelajú, Coban Imperial, Guastatoya
 José Luis González
 Gonzalo Gutiérrez - Suchitepéquez
 Enzo Herrera - Malacateco
 Claudio Inella - Malacateco
 Cono Javier Irazún -  Comunicaciones
 Adrián Elois Leites - Coban Imperial
 Gastón Linares - Heredia
 Bernardo Long - Xelaju
 Gonzalo Nicolás da Luz - Malacateco
 Santiago Ostolaza - Aurora
 Nestor Raul Pereira - Amatitlán
 Leonardo Gastón Puerari - Municipal
 Carlos Ramírez - Comunicaciones
 Jorge Rivaga
 Maximiliano Lombardi Rodríguez - Coban, Comunicaciones 
 Alberto Eiraldi Sellanes - Suchitepéquez
 Dario Silva - Sanarate
 Wilinton Techera - Mictlan, Malacateco, Siquinalá

North & Central America, Caribbean (CONCACAF)

Belize 
 Shane Orio - Suchitepéquez

Canada 
 Andrés Matías Fresenga - Suchitepéquez
 Adam Bisgaard - C.D. Malacateco

Costa Rica 
 Álvaro Aguilar - Xelaju
 Víctor Andrey Bolívar - Antigua, Petapa, Malacateco, Sanarate
 Daniel Cambronero - Malacateco
 Aaron Navarro Cespedes - Guastatoya
 Jhonny Cubero - Comunicaciones, Xelajú, Juventud Escuintleca, Coatepeque 
 Kenny Cunningham - Malacateco
 Diego Alonso Estrada - Comunicaciones
 Rolando Fonseca - Comunicaciones
 Andrey Francis - CSD Municipal, Malacateco
 Andy Furtado - Comunicaciones
 Jorge Ignacio Gatgens - Guastatoya
 Ronald Gomez - Municipal
 Rónald González - Comunicaciones
 Carlos Hernández - Municipal
 Carlos Herrera
 Andy Herron - USAC
 Gabriel Leiva - Malacateco
 Adrián de Lemos  - Antigua, Guastatoya
 Rafael Andrés Lezacano - Carcha, Malacateco, Antigua
 Luis Marín - USAC
 José Mena - Antigua
 Allan Miranda - Antigua, Malacateco
 Josué Mitchell -  Malacateco, Coban Imperial
 Nestor William Monge - Comunicaciones
 Aaron Navarro - Guastatoya
 Anllel Porras - Antigua
 Alexis Rivera
 Eric Arnoldo Scott -  Comunicaciones
 Verny Scott - Siquinala
 Mauricio Solís - Comunicaciones
 William Sunsing - Cobán Imperial, Xelajú MC, Sayaxché
 Michael Umaña  - Comunicaciones
 Luis Daniel Vallejos - Deportivo Ayutla
 Mauricio Wright - Comunicaciones

El Salvador 
 Jaime Alas - Municipal
 Carlos Castro Borja - Zacapa
 Rafael Burgos - Petapa, Universidad
 Josué Flores - Guastatoya
 Óscar Fuentes - Peñarol La Mesilla
 Mauricio Ernesto González - Xelaju MC
 Norberto Huezo - Jalapa, Deportivo Escuintla	
 Alexander Larín - Comunicaciones 
 Raúl Magaña - Tipografía Nacional, Municipal, USAC
 Juan Ramon Martinez - Municipal
 Luis Guevara Mora - Aurora, Xelaju MC
 Eliseo Quintanilla - Municipal
 Mauricio Quintanilla - Xelaju MC
 Guillermo Rivera - USAC
 José Luis Rugamas - Municipal
 Kevin Santamaria - Suchitepéquez
 José Alberto Tobar - Siquinalá

Guadeloupe 
 Victor Guay - Coban Imperial

Honduras 
 Quiarol Arzú - Guastatoya, Siquinalá
 Mario Castellanos - Heredia
 Santos Crisanto - Iztapa, Carcha, Gustatoya
 Nelson Martín Crossa - Municipal
 Rigoberto Gomez - Communicaciones
 Óscar Isaula - Malacateco
 Dennis Elias López - Municipal
 Walter Martinez - Xelaju
 Juan Cruz Murillo - Cobán Imperial
 Sergio Mendoza - USAC
 Rommel Murillo - Halcones de La Mesilla
 Milton Núñez  - USAC
 Darwin Eusebio Oliva - Saranate
 Carlos Pavón - Communicaciones
 Francisco Antonio Pavón - Xelaju
 Orvin Paz - Malacateco
 Jonathan Posas - Marquense, Suchitepequez, Sanarate
 Luis Rene Rodas - Siquinalá
 Angel Dionisio Rodríguez - Guastatoya
 Henry Suazo - Petapa, USAC,  Marquense, Halcones de La Mesilla
 Ángel Tejeda - Santa Lucia Cotzumalguapa
 Danilo Turcios - Communicaciones
 Jorge Zaldivar - Antigua, USAC, Sanarate

Mexico 
 Othoniel Arce - Siquinalá, Suchitepéquez, CSD Municipal
 Luis Gerardo Arroyo - Siquinalá
 Sergio Blancas - Chiantla, Siquinalá, Iztapa
 Darío Carreño - Comunicaciones
 Miguel Casanova - Peñarol
 Omar Dominguez - Gustatoya
 Carlos Kamiami Félix - Municipal, USAC, Xelaju	
 César Ivan García - Siquinalá
 Agustín Enrique Herrera - Antigua, Comunicaciones
 Luis Angel Landín - CSD Municipal, Guastatoya
 Raúl Nava López - Iztapa
 Brayan Adán Martínez - Xelaju
 Juan Carlos Meza - Sanarate
 Daniel Guzmán Miranda - Suchitepéquez, Chiantla, Guastatoya
 César Rosario Morales - Antigua, Comunicaciones, Xelajú
 Edgar Iván Pacheco - Antigua
 Mario Alberto Polanco - Marquense
 Ricardo Elionai Rocha - Malacateco
 Isaac Acuña Sánchez - Sanarate
 Liborio Vicente Sánchez - Chiantla, Iztapa
 Juan Carlos Silva - Malacateco, Sanarate, Xelaju
 Emmanuel Tapia - Guastatoya, Suchitepéquez

Nicaragua  
 Juan Barrera - Comunicaciones, Municipal
 Eulises Pavón - Suchitepéquez
 Roger Mayorga - Aurora

Panama  
 Felipe Baloy - Municipal
 José Calderón -  Heredia, Deportivo Coatepeque, Comunicaciones
 Adolfo Machado - Marquense, Comunicaciones
 Jaime Penedo - Municipal
 Blas Perez - Municipal
 Johnny Ruiz - Marquense
 Álvaro Luis Salazar - Sanarate

Saint Kitts and Nevis  
 Devaughn Elliott - Antigua

Trinidad and Tobago  
 Darren Dwayn Melández - Guastatoya
 Dwane James - Antigua

Asia (AFC)

South Korea 
 You Ki Sun - Siquinalá

Europe (UEFA)

England 
 TBD

Spain 
 Alvaro Portero Diez - Siquinalá
 José Ortega - Siquinalá

Notes

References

External links
 
 

Liga Nacional de Fútbol de Guatemala
Guatemala
 
Association football player non-biographical articles